was a well-known writer in Japan during the late 19th and early 20th century, best remembered for his popular fiction frequently set in the Edo and Kyoho eras featuring chivalric gangsters. In 1891, he published his first work "Mikazuki (Crescent Moon) under the alias "Chinunoura Namiroku" (ちぬの浦浪六), which was well received. He would go on to write more than 100 novels until 1930 and become a prominent writer of the time.

He was the maternal grandfather of Otoya Yamaguchi, the 17-year-old ultranationalist who assassinated Japan Socialist Party chairman Inejirō Asanuma in 1960.

Early life
Namiroku was born Murakami Makoto (信) in Sakai, Osaka, Japan. His father died when he was very young, and was a result was raised by his mother. When he was in elementary school, he was adopted by a politician of the time named Saisho Atsushi. Namiroku wanted to become a politician and businessman, but inevitably failed at those endeavors.

Writing career
In 1890, Namiroku joined the staff of the Tokyo-based mail order magazine company Hochi Shimbun as a proofreader. The following year, he published his first work of fiction "Mikazuki ("Crescent Moon"), which described the life of a swordsman who adhered to traditional samurai values, and which was very well received. The popularity of this debut novel allowed Namiroku to gain a footing in the literary world. Thereafter, he embarked on a series of novels about heroic chivalric street gangsters, which came to be known as "bachibin novels" after the hairstyle worn by their dashing streetwise heroes, whereby the hair (hin) on the head was shaved in the shape of a shamisen plectrum (bachi).

Bibliography

Mikazuki (三日月) Shunyodo Publishing Co.、1891
Idzutsu Jo Yukisuke (井筒女之助), Shunyodo Publishing Co., 1891
Oniyakko (鬼奴), Shunyodo Publishing Co.、1892
Yakko no Oman (奴の小万),　Shunyodo Publishing Co, 1892
Yabu Daitsudzumi (破大皷), Shunyodo Publishing Co.、1893
Yoarashi (夜嵐), Shunyodo Publishing Co.、1893
Namiroku Manpitsu (浪六漫筆) Shunyodo Publishing Co.、1893
Seishin Gunki (征清軍記), Aoki Sūzandō Publishing Co.、1894
Namiroku Soushou 10-ban Nouchi Tasoya Andon (浪六叢書十番のうちたそや行燈) Shunyodo Publishing Co.、1894
Nochi no Mikazuki (後の三日月), Shunyodo Publishing Co., 1894
Nisshin Jiken Shinshousetsu (日清事件新小説) Aoki Sūzandō Publishing Co., 1895
Fukaamigasa (深見笠), Shunyodo Publishing Co., 1894
Hige no Jikyuu (髯の自休), Shunyodo Publishing Co., 1894
Yasuda Sakubee (安田作兵衛), Shunyodo Publishing Co., 1894
Kaizoku (海賊) Aoki Sūzandō Publishing Co., 1895
Koga-shi『古賀市』Aoki Sūzandō Publishing Co., 1895
Sakana-ya Sukezaemon (魚屋助左衛門) Aoki Sūzandō Publishing Co., 1895
Nochi no Kaizoku (後の海賊) Aoki Sūzandō Publishing Co., 1895
Osaka-jou (大阪城) Aoki Sūzandō Publishing Co., 1896
Onii Azami (鬼あざみ) Aoki Sūzandō Publishing Co., 1896
10-Moji (十文字) Aoki Sūzandō Publishing Co., 1896
Shinpei-ei『新兵衛』斎藤栄造
Kyasha (Minshaan)　(花車 (眠獅庵)) Aoki Sūzandō Publishing Co., 1896 
『呂宋助左衛門』Aoki Sūzandō Publishing Co., 1896
『しなさだめ』Aoki Sūzandō Publishing Co., 1897 (浪六文庫)
『当世五人男』Aoki Sūzandō Publishing Co., 1897
『武者気質』Aoki Sūzandō Publishing Co., 1897
『狂歌集』Aoki Sūzandō Publishing Co., 1898
『浮世草紙』Aoki Sūzandō Publishing Co., 1898
『蔦の細道』Aoki Sūzandō Publishing Co., 1898
『最後の黒田健次』Aoki Sūzandō Publishing Co., 1899
『赤蜻蛉』Aoki Sūzandō Publishing Co., 1900
『原田甲斐』Aoki Sūzandō Publishing Co., 1900
『明治十年』Aoki Sūzandō Publishing Co., 1900
『春日局』Shinshinō Publishing Co.、1901
『伊達振子』Aoki Sūzandō Publishing Co., 1901
『日本武士』Aoki Sūzandō Publishing Co., 1901
『やまと心』Aoki Sūzandō Publishing Co., 1901
『うき世日記』駸々堂、1902
『男一疋』駸々堂
『三人兄弟』Aoki Sūzandō Publishing Co., 1902
『時雨笠』Shinshinō Publishing Co., 1902
『浪華名物男』Aoki Sūzandō Publishing Co., 1902
『八幡座』Aoki Sūzandō Publishing Co., 1902
『男山』Shinshinō Publishing Co., 1902
『毒婦』Aoki Sūzandō Publishing Co., 1902
『うやむや日記』青木嵩山堂、1904
『金剛盤』Aoki Sūzandō Publishing Co., 1904
『業平文治』田中霜柳 鹿鳴社、1905
『石田三成』Aoki Sūzandō Publishing Co., 1905
『最後の岡崎俊平』Aoki Sūzandō Publishing Co., 1905
『大悪魔』Aoki Sūzandō Publishing Co., 1905
『夜叉男』Aoki Sūzandō Publishing Co., 1905
『雪達磨』Shinshinō Publishing Co., 1902
『仍如件』Aoki Sūzandō Publishing Co., 1906
『普通文範』村上信 石塚書舗、1907
『川柳自在』石塚書舗
『浮世車』Aoki Sūzandō Publishing Co., 1907
『元禄女』隆文館
『高倉長右衛門』駸々堂
『当世女』Aoki Sūzandō Publishing Co., 1907
『浮舟』Aoki Sūzandō Publishing Co., 1908
『日蓮』民友社
『八軒長屋』民友社
『稲田一作』民友社、1909
『煩悶病院』Aoki Sūzandō Publishing Co., 1910
『馬鹿野郎』金葉堂、1911
『豊太閤』民友社
『元禄忠魂録』至誠堂、1912
『居家処世人間学』大江書房、1913
『いたづらもの』大江書房
『現代思潮男女の戦ひ』至誠堂書店
『生きたる人間の解剖』大江書房、1914
『浪六全集』全26編 至誠堂書店、1914-1926
『黒雲』至誠堂書店
『雪だるま』至誠堂書店
『落花狼藉』文明社
『罵倒録』至誠堂書店
『元禄四十七士』至誠堂書店
『我五十年』加島虎吉
『放言録』至誠堂書店、1915
『人生の裏面』東亜堂書房、1916
『人の垢』明文館書店
『人生の旅行』明文館書店
『大正五人男』至誠堂書店
『世間学』大阪屋号書店
『天眼通』至誠堂書店、1917
『皮肉文集』紅陽社、1919
『川徳』至誠堂書店
『裸体の人間』至誠堂書店
『出放題』至誠堂書店
『浪六八ッあたり』浪六会
『裏と表』至誠堂書店、1920
『無遠慮』至誠堂書店、1921
『浪六漱石傑作文集』綱島書店(美文評解叢書)1921
『かはりもの』明文館
『牛肉一斤』至誠堂書店、1922
『親鸞』明文館書店
『時代相』全5巻 時代相刊行会、1923-24
『無名の英雄』時代相刊行会、1925
『人間味』明文堂書店
『浪六名作選集』大日本雄弁会
『浪六傑作集』人情編、恋愛編 内外出版協会、1926
『妙法院勘八』大日本雄辯會講談社
『人の力』明文館書店、1927
『浮世の裏表』金竜堂出版部
『蜂須賀小六』明文館書店、1929
『かまいたち』明文館書店、1930
『人情の表裏』紅陽社
『浪六全集』45篇 玉井清文堂、1930-31
『侠客列伝 第1巻』明文館書店、1931
『鈴木新内』明文館書店
『うき世の雨に破れ傘』明文館書店、1934
『すてうり勘兵衛』浪六叢書刊行会
『侠客』明文館
『一足飛』興文閣、1940
『毒か薬か』モナス
『鬼伏せ頭巾』興文閣、1941
『海上の歴史』輝文堂書房、1943

References

External links 

1865 births
1944 deaths
People from Sakai, Osaka
19th-century Japanese novelists
20th-century Japanese novelists